Koyukon (also called Denaakk'e) is the geographically most widespread Athabascan language spoken in Alaska. The Athabaskan language is spoken along the Koyukuk and the middle Yukon River in western interior Alaska. In 2007, the language had approximately 300 speakers, who were generally older adults bilingual in English. The total Koyukon ethnic population was 2,300.

History
Jules Jetté, a French Canadian Jesuit missionary, began recording the language and culture of the Koyukon people in 1898. Considered a fluent Koyukon speaker after spending years in the region, Jetté died in 1927. He had made a significant quantity of notes on the Koyukon people, their culture and beliefs, and their language.

Eliza Jones, a Koyukon, came across these manuscripts while studying, and later working, at the University of Alaska in the early 1970s. Working from Jetté's notes and in consultation with Koyukon tribal elders, Jones wrote the Koyukon Athabaskan Dictionary. It was edited by James Kari and published in 2000 by the Alaska Native Language Center at the University of Alaska Fairbanks.

The Koyukon Athabaskan Dictionary is unusually comprehensive in terms of documentation of an American indigenous language, in part because Jetté's notes were of excellent quality and depth. In addition, he wrote about the language and culture nearly a century ago, when the language was far more widely spoken in daily life and the Koyukon people were living in a more traditional way. The use of the word, "Dictionary", in the title is perhaps misleading; the book is more similar to an encyclopedia, as it also is a record of the culture and traditions of the Koyukon people.

The book includes traditional stories recorded by Catherine Attla and published in 1983 by the University of Alaska Fairbanks.

Three dialects
As of 1978 there were three Koyukon Language dialects (Lower, Central and Upper). Lower Koyukon
was spoken in Kaltag and Nulato; Central Koyukon was spoken on the Yukon River in the villages of Galena, Ruby, Koyukuk and part of Tanana, and on the Koyukuk River in the villages of Huslia, Hughes, and Allakaket; Upper Koyukon was spoken at Stevens Village, Rampart, and part of Tanana.

Language revitalization 
In 2012, Susan Pavskan reported:
On Thursday evenings Denaakk'e (Koyukon Athabascan) classes are held at Yukon-Koyukuk School District offices in Fairbanks and Huslia. About 18 people from four generations attended Thursday over video-conference. At the end of class, I demonstrated how MP3 sound files can be imported into iTunes then synced with iPads or iPods. The students demonstrated these to their parents and grandparents.

The children's show Molly of Denali features the Koyukon language.

Phonology and orthography

Consonants
Sounds are given in IPA with the orthographic equivalent in angled brackets:

Plosives and affricates, other than the labial b and the glottal , distinguish plain, aspirated and ejective forms. Other consonants include labial and alveolar nasals; alveolar, velar and glottal fricatives; and alveolar and palatal approximants. Again other than the labial m and the glottal h, these distinguish forms with and without voice.

Vowels
There are four full vowels in Koyukon:
 
 
 
 
And there are three reduced vowels:
 
  (previously  and )

References

Further reading

Attla, Catherine. 1983. Sitsiy Yugh NoholnikTs'in': As My Grandfather Told It. Fairbanks: Alaska Native Language Center and Yukon-Koyukuk School District.
Axelrod, Melissa. (1990). "Incorporation in Koyukon Athabaskan", International Journal of American Linguistics 56, 179-195.
Axelrod, Melissa. (1993). The Semantics of Time: Aspectual Categorization in Koyukon Athabaskan. Lincoln: University of Nebraska Press.
Axelrod, Melissa. 2000. "The Semantics of Classification in Koyukon Athabaskan," In: The Athabaskan Languages: Perspectives on a Native American Language Family. Fernald, T and Paul R. Platero eds. Oxford University Press.
Henry, Chief. (1976). K'ooltsaah Ts'in'. Koyukon Riddles. Fairbanks: Alaska Native Language Center.
Henry, Chief. (1979). Chief Henry Yugh Noholnigee: The Stories Chief Henry Told. (Transcribed and edited by Eliza Jones). Fairbanks: Alaska Native Language Center.
Henry, David and Kay Henry. (1969). "Koyukon locationals", Anthropological Linguistics 11(4): 136-42.
Jette, Jules and Eliza Jones (authors) and James Kari (ed.). (2000). Koyukon Athabaskan Dictionary. Fairbanks: Alaska Native Language Center.
Jones, Eliza. (1986). Koyukon Ethnogeography. Alaska Historical Commission.
Jones, Eliza, Comp. Junior Dictionary for Central Koyukon Athabaskan: Dinaakkanaaga Ts'inh Huyoza. Alaska Native Language Center, University of Alaska Fairbanks, P.O. Box 900111, Fairbanks, AK 99775-0120, 1992.
Nelson, Richard K. 1986. Make Prayers to the Raven: A Koyukon View of the Northern Forest. Chicago: University of Chicago Press.

External links
Service Book in the Dialect of the Qlīyukuwhūtana Indians: Portions of the Book of Common Prayer in Upper Koyukon (1908) digitized by Richard Mammana
Alaska Native Language Center
Word-Lists of the Athabaskan, Yup'ik and Alutiiq Languages by Lt. Laurence Zagoskin, 1847 (containing Koyukon on pages 3–8)
Koyukon basic lexicon at the Global Lexicostatistical Database

Koyukon
Endangered Dené–Yeniseian languages
Indigenous languages of Alaska
Indigenous languages of the North American Subarctic
Northern Athabaskan languages
Native American language revitalization
Official languages of Alaska